In Greek mythology, Polygonus (Ancient Greek: Πολύγονον means 'prolific') was the Thracian son of the sea god Proteus by Torone (Chrysonoe) of Phlegra. He was the brother of Telegonus. Polygonus was also called Tmolus in some accounts.

Mythology 
Due to Polygonus' and Telegonus' "stranger-slaying wrestling", Proteus prayed to his father Poseidon to carry him back to Egypt away from them. Under the command of Hera, the brothers challenged the hero Heracles to wrestle but lost their lives in the battle.

Notes

References 

 Apollodorus, The Library with an English Translation by Sir James George Frazer, F.B.A., F.R.S. in 2 Volumes, Cambridge, MA, Harvard University Press; London, William Heinemann Ltd. 1921. ISBN 0-674-99135-4. Online version at the Perseus Digital Library. Greek text available from the same website.
 Conon, Fifty Narrations, surviving as one-paragraph summaries in the Bibliotheca (Library) of Photius, Patriarch of Constantinople translated from the Greek by Brady Kiesling. Online version at the Topos Text Project.
 Lycophron, The Alexandra  translated by Alexander William Mair. Loeb Classical Library Volume 129. London: William Heinemann, 1921. Online version at the Topos Text Project.
 Lycophron, Alexandra translated by A.W. Mair. London: William Heinemann; New York: G.P. Putnam's Sons. 1921. Greek text available at the Perseus Digital Library.
John Tzetzes, Book of Histories, Book II-IV translated by Gary Berkowitz from the original Greek of T. Kiessling's edition of 1826. Online version at theio.com
Stephanus of Byzantium, Stephani Byzantii Ethnicorum quae supersunt, edited by August Meineike (1790-1870), published 1849. A few entries from this important ancient handbook of place names have been translated by Brady Kiesling. Online version at the Topos Text Project.

Thracian characters in Greek mythology
Greek mythology of Thrace
Mythology of Heracles